Hideaki Motoyama (25 July 1969 – 29 July 2009) was a Japanese badminton player. He competed in the men's singles tournament at the 1992 Summer Olympics.

References

1969 births
2009 deaths
Japanese male badminton players
Olympic badminton players of Japan
Badminton players at the 1992 Summer Olympics
Place of birth missing